Control Council Law No 22, Works Councils (10 April 1946) was a German labour law drafted in Allied-occupied Germany by the Military Government, to enable organisation of work councils in rebuilding the economy and society after World War II. Work councils, which employees of a firm organised and elected democratically to determine workplace issues, had existed in Germany in various forms since 1889. They had been abolished by Adolf Hitler's Nazi party. The new Control Council Law No 22 provided a template for democratic German trade unions to reorganise through collective agreements with employers.

Contents
The key provisions of the new Law were articles I and V, empowering trade unions to organise work councils, and providing a template set of rights for elected representatives.

Development
The Control Council Law No 22 was replaced by a more comprehensive Betriebsrätegesetz 1952 (Work Councils Act 1952) once the new German constitution had passed in 1949, and a democratic government had been elected.

See also
Codetermination
European labour law
United States labor law
United Kingdom labour law
French labour law

Notes

References
E McGaughey, 'The Codetermination Bargains: The History of German Corporate and Labour Law' (2016) 23(1) Columbia Journal of European Law 135

External links
Full text of Control Council Law No 22 on Wikisource

Labour law